Demodex gatoi is a hair follicle mite from the skin surface of the domestic cat, Felis silvestris.
It is the second described species of Demodex from the domestic cat, and is distinguishable from Demodex cati by being shorter and rounder.

References

Trombidiformes
Animals described in 1999